Gary Bennett is a Canadian politician and local business person. He served as the Mayor of the City of Kingston, Ontario in Canada from 1994 to 2000.

Work and education

Bennett was born in Kingston and has lived there his entire life. He graduated from Loyalist Collegiate and Vocational Institute in 1972. He later went on to earn an Honours BA in Political Science from Queen’s University and a Masters in Public Administration from the School of Policy Studies at Queen’s.

Bennett began his early work career working in his family’s business, Bennett’s Foods. He is currently employed as a Manager for Bendale Property Management, a condominium and asset management company that manages properties throughout the Kingston, Gananoque, and Brockville region. Over the years, Bennett has been active in the riding associations of the Progressive Conservative Party of Canada, its successor, the Conservative Party of Canada and the provincial Progressive Conservative Party of Ontario.

Local councillor

Bennett continued a family tradition of serving on Kingston City Council by being elected as the city councillor for St. Lawrence Ward in 1988. His father, grandfather and great-grandfather have all previously served on Kingston’s City Council.

During his time on council, Bennett served on the Kingston Police Services Board, the Kingston Library Board, Town Homes Kingston, the District Health Council for the region and was active on the Association of Municipalities of Ontario (AMO) serving on the Large Urban Caucus.

He served two terms as the councillor for the St. Lawrence district of the City of Kingston between 1988 and 1994.

Mayor
Bennett was elected for two terms as Mayor of the City of Kingston serving his first term from 1994 to 1997. As the head of Council, he participated in the initiative to create the new City of Kingston from the old City of Kingston, Kingston Township and Pittsburgh Township. It was one of the few areas in Ontario that were able to achieve a locally negotiated agreement on amalgamation. As part of the amalgamation agreement, the local Public Utilities Commission was also assumed by the new City of Kingston. Bennett served as the last Mayor of the former City of Kingston.

In 1996, during his first term in office, Bennett spoke at the yearly gravesite ceremony honouring Canada’s first prime minister and proud Kingston resident Sir John A. Macdonald. His address was later published by the Kingston Historical Society.

Bennett was elected in 1997 as the first mayor of the new amalgamated City of Kingston and served as Mayor from 1997 to 2000. During his term in office, Bennett led the community through the only locally declared civic emergency in recent times during the Ice Storm of 1998.

During his term, the city established a yearly capital surcharge on all property tax classes to address the long term capital infrastructure needs of the new city, it continues to be an important source of capital funding for the city. Bennett chaired a local United Way campaign in his community during his term in office.

Bennett was unsuccessful when he ran for re-election in 2000, losing to Isabel Turner. The persistent difficulties faced by the new city’s first post-amalgamation government were considered a determining factor in the election outcome.

Provincial politics
On June 11, 2017, Bennett was nominated to represent the Ontario Progressive Conservative Party in Kingston and the Islands in the 2018 provincial election, defeating a field of three other challengers for the nomination but was defeated in the subsequent provincial election, placing third behind the NDP and Liberal candidates.

References

Living people
Year of birth missing (living people)
Progressive Conservative Party of Ontario candidates in Ontario provincial elections
Mayors of Kingston, Ontario